Magdalena Krssakova (born 3 March 1994) is an Austrian judoka. She won the silver medal in the women's 63 kg event at the 2020 European Judo Championships held in Prague, Czech Republic.

Career
She attended school the Ella Lingens Gymnasiums in Vienna.

In 2017, she competed in the women's 63 kg event at the European Judo Championships held in Warsaw, Poland. In that same year, she also competed in the women's 63 kg event at the 2017 World Judo Championships held in Budapest, Hungary.

In 2019, she represented Austria at the European Games held in Minsk, Belarus. She won one of the bronze medals in the mixed team event.

In January 2021, she competed in the women's 63 kg event at the Judo World Masters held in Doha, Qatar. In June 2021, she competed in the women's 63 kg event at the World Judo Championships held in Budapest, Hungary.

Krssakova competed in the 2020 Summer Olympics in Tokyo, in the women's 63 kg event, and was eliminated in the round of 16.

She won one of the bronze medals in her event at the 2022 Judo Grand Slam Antalya held in Antalya, Turkey.

Achievements

Awards
 Sportlerin des Jahres 2018 (eng. Sportswoman of the Year 2018)

References

External links
 

Living people
1994 births
Place of birth missing (living people)
Austrian female judoka
Judoka at the 2019 European Games
European Games medalists in judo
European Games bronze medalists for Austria
Judoka at the 2020 Summer Olympics
Olympic judoka of Austria
21st-century Austrian women